Jack Jasinski (born December 4, 2003) is an American professional soccer player who plays as a defender for USL Championship side Philadelphia Union II.

Club career
Jasinksi began his youth soccer career with Charlotte Soccer Academy before joining the youth side of Major League Soccer club Philadelphia Union in 2018. On July 18, 2020, Jasinski made his professional debut for the Philadelphia Union II, the Union's reserve side in the USL Championship, against the Pittsburgh Riverhounds. He came on as a substitute to start the second half but couldn't prevent the Union II from losing 6–0.

Career statistics

Club

References

External links
Profile at the USSDA website

2003 births
Living people
American soccer players
Association football forwards
Philadelphia Union II players
USL Championship players
Soccer players from North Carolina